Asociația Clubul Sportiv Târgu Secuiesc, commonly known mainly after its Hungarian name as KSE Târgu Secuiesc or simply KSE, is a Romanian women's basketball club based in Târgu Secuiesc, currently participates in the Liga Națională, the top-tier league in Romania.

The club initially played in the second-tier Liga I. However, in 2018 the league was merged with the top-tier Liga Națională.

Current roster

References

External links
 KSE Târgu Secuiesc. at totalbaschet.ro
 Kézdivásárhely Basket

Basketball teams in Romania
Women's basketball teams in Romania
Basketball teams established in 2008
2008 establishments in Romania